Karakolda Ayna Var is a 1966 Turkish comedy film, directed by Halit Refiğ and starring Sadri Alisik, Fatma Girik, and Suphi Tekniker.

References

External links
Karakolda Ayna Var at the Internet Movie Database

1966 films
Turkish comedy films
1966 comedy films
Films directed by Halit Refiğ